Here and There is a jazz album by multi-instrumentalist Eric Dolphy. It was originally released in 1966 on the Prestige label as PRLP 7382. It contains tracks recorded on three separate dates, in different locations. Mal Waldron's "Status Seeking" and Dolphy's solo bass clarinet version of Billie Holiday's "God Bless the Child" were recorded on July 16, 1961 at the Five Spot in New York City as part of the concert that was documented on the At the Five Spot recordings. (This version of "God Bless the Child" was Dolphy's first recorded performance of the tune.) "April Fool" and "G.W. (Take 1)" were recorded on April 1, 1960 at Van Gelder Studio in Englewood Cliffs, New Jersey as part of the session that yielded Outward Bound, Dolphy's first album as a leader. ("G.W. (Take 1)" is an alternate take of the first track on Outward Bound. It previously appeared on Dash One, and was not part of the original LP issue of Here and There. "G.W." is dedicated to the Californian bandleader Gerald Wilson.) "Don't Blame Me" was recorded on September 6, 1961 in Berlingske Has, Copenhagen, Denmark during Dolphy's second European tour, as part of the sessions that produced Eric Dolphy in Europe Volumes 1-3.

Reception
In a review for AllMusic, Scott Yanow wrote: "Although it is easy to think of this set on a whole as containing 'leftovers,' Dolphy's strong playing on alto, flute and bass clarinet makes the music of strong interest to his fans."

Track listing
"Status Seeking" (Waldron) – 13:08
"God Bless the Child" (Billie Holiday/Arthur Herzog Jr.) – 5:16
"April Fool" (Dolphy) – 4:10
"G.W." [Take 1] (Dolphy) – 12:11
"Don't Blame Me" (Jimmy McHugh/Dorothy Fields) – 13:07

Personnel
Eric Dolphy – alto sax (tracks 1, 4), bass clarinet (2), flute (3, 5)
Mal Waldron – piano (1)
Booker Little – trumpet (1)
Eddie Blackwell – drums (1)
Richard Davis – double bass (1)
Roy Haynes – drums (3, 4)
Freddie Hubbard – trumpet (4)
George Tucker – double bass (3, 4)
Jaki Byard – piano (3, 4)
Bent Axen – piano (5)
Erik Moseholm – double bass (5)
Jorn Elniff – drums (5)

References

Eric Dolphy live albums
1966 live albums
Prestige Records live albums
Albums recorded at Van Gelder Studio
Albums produced by Esmond Edwards